Elections were held in the organized municipalities in the Nipissing District of Ontario on October 24, 2022 in conjunction with municipal elections across the province.

The following are the results of the mayoral races in each municipality and the council races in the City of North Bay.

Bonfield

Mayor
The following were the results for mayor of Bonfield.

Calvin

Mayor
The following were the results for mayor of Calvin.

Chisholm

Mayor
Gail Degagne was re-elected as mayor of Chisholm by acclamation.

East Ferris

Mayor
Mayor Pauline Rochefort was re-elected by acclamation.

Mattawa

Mayor
The following were the results for mayor of Mattawa.

Mattawan
Peter Murphy was re-elected as mayor of Mattawan by acclamation.

Mayor

North Bay
The following are the results for mayor and city council of North Bay.

Mayor
North Bay mayor Al McDonald announced he was not running for re-election. Running to replace him were former city councillor and president of the North Bay Chamber of Commerce Peter Chirico, city councillor Johanne Brousseau and public service worker Leslie McVeety.

North Bay City Council
10 to be elected

Papineau-Cameron

Mayor
Robert Corriveau was re-elected as mayor of Papineau-Cameron by acclamation.

South Algonquin

Mayor
The following were the results  mayor of South Algonquin.

Temagami

Mayor
Dan O'Mara was re-elected for mayor of Temagami by acclamation.

West Nipissing

Mayor
The following were the results for mayor of West Nipissing.

References

Nipissing
Nipissing District